The Yermolayev Yer-2 was a long-range Soviet medium bomber used during World War II. It was developed from the Bartini Stal-7 prototype airliner before the war. It was used to bomb Berlin from airbases in Estonia after Operation Barbarossa began in 1941. Production was terminated in August 1941 to allow the factory to concentrate on building higher-priority Ilyushin Il-2 ground-attack aircraft, but was restarted at the end of 1943 with new, fuel-efficient, Charomskiy ACh-30B aircraft Diesel engines.

Although designed as a long-range medium bomber it was flown on tactical ground-attack missions during the Battle of Moscow with heavy losses. The survivors were flown, in ever dwindling numbers, until August 1943 when the last examples were transferred to schools. However, the resumption of production in 1943 allowed the aircraft to resume combat operations in April 1945. The Yer-2 remained in service with Long-Range Aviation until it was replaced by four-engined bombers such as the Tupolev Tu-4  at the end of the 1940s.

Development
Roberto Bartini had designed and built the Stal-7 airliner whilst he was the chief designer at the ZOK NII GVF ( — "Factory for Special Constructions at the Scientific Test Institute for the Civil Air Fleet"). The performance of the Stal-7 was exceptional, particularly in respect to its payload: at gross overload weight over 56% of the total weight was payload. During flight trials with maximum all-up weight the prototype crashed on takeoff in early 1938, resulting in the arrest of Bartini and his imprisonment in a Siberian Gulag in February 1938. The Stal-7 lay unrepaired until Vladimir Yermolaev was appointed as chief designer at OKB-240 after Bartini's arrest, with the task of transforming the Stal-7 design into a long-range bomber, a task made easier since Bartini had reserved space for a bomb bay in the fuselage.

Preliminary design of the DB-240 (—"long-range bomber"), as the bomber version was designated, was completed by the beginning of 1939 and the construction of two prototypes began the following July. The DB-240 retained little apart from the general layout of the Stal-7 as the structure was almost completely redesigned. The pilot's cockpit was offset to port to improve his downward view and the navigator/bomb aimer sat in the extensively glazed nose with a  ShKAS machine gun, the radio operator sat below and to starboard of the pilot and the dorsal gunner in a partially retractable turret with one  Berezin UBT machine gun. Another ShKAS was fitted in a ventral hatch. The DB-240 had been designed to use the experimental Klimov M-106 V12 engines, but the less-powerful Klimov M-105 engine had to be substituted because the M-106 was not available.

The DB-240 prototype flew for the first time on 14 May 1940 and began its State acceptance tests on 27 September 1940. The weaker engines prevented the DB-240 from reaching its designed performance. Its defensive armament was deemed inadequate and other problems included an excessively long take-off run and engine defects. However, these did not offset its virtues of a heavy bomb load and long-range ( carrying  of bombs). It was ordered into production at Factory No. 18, in Voronezh, as the Yermolayev Yer-2.

Manufacture began in March 1941, with approximately 50 aircraft delivered by 22 June 1941. Production was terminated in August 1941 with only 128 built to allow the factory to concentrate on the higher-priority Ilyushin Il-2 ground-attack aircraft.

A Yer-2 was modified with experimental Mikulin AM-37 engines, a reinforced undercarriage, armored seats for the navigator and gunner, and 12.7 mm UBT machine guns in place of its original ShKAS weapons. One significant problem with this version was the excessive takeoff roll which hindered operations from grass airstrips. The engine was unreliable, however, and had cooling problems that the Mikulin OKB did not have the resources to resolve so it was cancelled in October when the factory was forced to evacuate from Moscow by the German advance.

The Charomskiy M-40F Diesel engine was also evaluated in a Yer-2 in 1941. This engine, like all Diesels, offered a greatly reduced fuel consumption compared to a standard gasoline-powered engine, but at a great penalty in weight. However, the M-40 was not yet ready for service use and the project was cancelled.

The aircraft/engine combination did have enough potential that development work continued using the closely related, but more mature, Charomskiy ACh-30B Diesel engine. The cockpit was modified to accommodate two pilots side-by-side and the wing and tailplane areas were increased. The 12.7 mm UBT machine gun in the dorsal turret was replaced by a  ShVAK cannon and the nose and ventral ShKAS machine guns were exchanged for 12.7 mm UBT machine guns. The Yer-2/ACh-30B was placed into production at Factory No. 39 in Irkutsk at the end of 1943 and the first production aircraft was submitted to its State acceptance trials the following month. Some excess aircraft were converted as Yer-2ON VIP transports.

Operational history
The Yer-2 was not in squadron service when Germany invaded on 22 June 1941, but the 420th and 421st Long-Range Bomber Regiments (—DBAP) were formed shortly afterwards. However neither regiment flew any operational missions until later in the summer. On the evening of 10 August Yer-2s of the 420th DBAP, accompanied by Petlyakov Pe-8s of the 432nd DBAP, attempted to bomb Berlin from Pushkino Airfield near Leningrad. The airfield was too short to accommodate a fully loaded Yer-2, but three bombers did manage to take off regardless. Two managed to bomb Berlin, or its outskirts, but only one successfully returned; the other was shot down by 'friendly' Polikarpov I-16s when it reentered Soviet airspace and the third aircraft went missing. Three crews from the 420th DBAP bombed Königsberg during the nights of 28–29 and 30 August – 1 September from Ramenskoye Airport, southeast of Moscow.

On 1 October 1941 63 Yer-2s were in service, but only 34 were operational. The 420th DBAP had flown 154 sorties by the beginning of November (6 in August, 81 in September, 67 in October) and had lost 30 of its 40 aircraft. Over half of these (19) were due to non-combat losses. Losses were extremely high over the autumn and winter as they were inappropriately committed against German tactical frontline targets during the Battle of Moscow at low altitudes and only 12 were in service on 18 March 1942. On 4 August 1942 the 747th DBAP had only ten Yer-2s on hand and it was briefly committed during the Battle of Stalingrad. The survivors were flown, in ever dwindling numbers, until August 1943 when the last few aircraft were transferred to schools by the 2nd Guards DBAP and the 747th DBAP.

The Yer-2 was placed back into production at the end of 1943, but none of the new bombers had been issued to combat units by 1 June 1944. However 42 were in service on 1 January 1945 and 101 on 10 May 1945 after the war ended. The first combat mission undertaken by Yer-2s after they returned to production was a raid on Königsberg on 7 April 1945 by the 327th and 329th Bomber Aviation Regiments. It remained in service with Long-Range Aviation units until replaced by four-engined bombers like the Tupolev Tu-4 in the late 1940s.

Variants
DB-240
Two prototypes of the Yer-2 series with two 1,050 hp M-105 engines.
Yer-2
Production version with two M-105 engines, 128 built.
Yer-2/AM-37
One aircraft re-engined with two prototype 1,380 hp Mikulin AM-37 engines, the fastest of all Yer-2s.
Yer-2/M-40F
The first diesel-powered Yer-2, with modified wings. One converted with two 1,500 hp Charomskiy M-40F diesel engines.
Yer-2/ACh-30B
Production model of the diesel-engined version. Performance was excellent despite the poor reliability and rough running of the Charomskiy ACh-30B diesel engines. Range increased  from the version with M-105 engines.
Yer-2ON
(−Special Assignment) Two aircraft from the Yer-2/ACh-30B production line were modified with a 12-seat VIP cabin, military equipment removed and long-range fuel tanks in the bomb-bay. A third aircraft was converted from a Yer-2 (1941 production) and used for shuttle flights between Irkutsk and Moscow.
Yer-2N
(−Carrier) One aircraft was modified as an engine testbed for captured Argus As 014 pulse jet engines.
Yer-2/MB-100
One production aircraft used as a testbed for the  Dobrotvorskii MB-100 engine in 1945.
Yer-4
The final iteration of the Yer-2 series was a 1941 production aircraft re-engined with ACh-30BF engines and redesignated as the Yer-4. It had a slightly larger wingspan, increased takeoff weight and improved armament. The prototype was tested in December 1943, but did not enter production.

Operators
 
 VVS (—Soviet Air Forces)
ADD (—Long Range Aviation)
420th Long-Range Bomber Aviation Regiment, later the 748th Long-Range Bomber Aviation Regiment
421st Long-Range Bomber Aviation Regiment, later the 747th Long-Range Bomber Aviation Regiment
747th Long-Range Bomber Aviation Regiment
748th Long-Range Bomber Aviation Regiment, later the 2nd Guards Long-Range Aviation Regiment
327th Long-Range Bomber Aviation Regiment
329th Long-Range Bomber Aviation Regiment

Specifications (Yer-2/ACh-30B)

See also

References

Notes

Bibliography

External links

 Short article on the Yer-2
 Drawing of the Yer-2, among others
 Long article on the development history 

1940s Soviet bomber aircraft
Yer-2
Diesel-engined aircraft
Aircraft first flown in 1940
Inverted gull-wing aircraft
Twin piston-engined tractor aircraft